Elections to Belfast City Council were held on 15 May 1985 on the same day as the other Northern Irish local government elections. The election used nine district electoral areas to elect a total of 51 councillors, most representing the more heavily populated north and west.

The UUP became the largest party, overtaking the DUP and John Carson became the Lord Mayor.

Election results

Note: "Votes" are the first preference votes.

Districts summary

|- class="unsortable" align="centre"
!rowspan=2 align="left"|Ward
! % 
!Cllrs
! % 
!Cllrs
! %
!Cllrs
! %
!Cllrs
! %
!Cllrs
! %
!Cllrs
! %
!Cllrs
! %
!Cllrs
!rowspan=2|TotalCllrs
|- class="unsortable" align="center"
!colspan=2 bgcolor="" | UUP
!colspan=2 bgcolor="" | DUP
!colspan=2 bgcolor="" | Alliance
!colspan=2 bgcolor="" | Sinn Féin
!colspan=2 bgcolor=""| SDLP
!colspan=2 bgcolor="" | Workers' Party
!colspan=2 bgcolor="" | PUP
!colspan=2 bgcolor="white"| Others
|-
|align="left"|Balmoral
|bgcolor="40BFF5"|41.7
|bgcolor="40BFF5"|2
|25.5
|2
|18.5
|1
|0.0
|0
|10.4
|0
|1.0
|0
|0.0
|0
|2.9
|0
|5
|-
|align="left"|Castle
|bgcolor="40BFF5"|32.7
|bgcolor="40BFF5"|2
|17.1
|1
|9.6
|1
|0.0
|0
|19.6
|1
|3.4
|0
|0.0
|0
|17.6
|1
|6
|-
|align="left"|Court
|21.6
|2
|17.9
|1
|5.1
|0
|3.5
|0
|0.0
|0
|1.3
|0
|24.2
|1
|bgcolor="#0077FF"|36.1
|bgcolor="#0077FF"|2
|6
|-
|align="left"|Laganbank
|bgcolor="40BFF5"|30.0
|bgcolor="40BFF5"|2
|22.1
|1
|20.8
|1
|16.9
|1
|5.6
|0
|5.0
|0
|0.0
|0
|2.1
|0
|5
|-
|align="left"|Lower Falls
|0.0
|0
|0.0
|0
|9.4
|1
|bgcolor="#008800"|57.2
|bgcolor="#008800"|3
|23.4
|1
|9.4
|0
|0.0
|0
|0.6
|0
|5
|-
|align="left"|Oldpark
|17.5
|1
|11.4
|1
|3.7
|0
|bgcolor="#008800"|28.5
|bgcolor="#008800"|2
|16.1
|1
|9.4
|1
|3.0
|0
|10.4
|0
|6
|-
|align="left"|Pottinger
|28.9
|2
|bgcolor="#D46A4C"|47.5
|bgcolor="#D46A4C"|3
|8.3
|1
|4.6
|0
|2.8
|0
|2.4
|0
|3.2
|0
|2.3
|0
|6
|-
|align="left"|Upper Falls
|0.0
|0
|2.9
|0
|7.3
|1
|bgcolor="#008800"|44.1
|bgcolor="#008800"|2
|39.2
|2
|3.1
|0
|0.0
|0
|3.4
|0
|5
|-
|align="left"|Victoria
|bgcolor="40BFF5"|42.5
|bgcolor="40BFF5"|3
|33.2
|2
|23.1
|2
|0.0
|0
|1.2
|0
|0.0
|0
|0.0
|0
|0.0
|0
|7
|- class="unsortable" class="sortbottom" style="background:#C9C9C9"
|align="left"| Total
|24.4
|14
|19.9
|11
|11.5
|8
|15.6
|7
|14.2
|6
|3.8
|1
|2.2
|1
|8.4
|3
|51
|-
|}

District results

Balmoral

1985: 2 x UUP, 2 x DUP, 1 x Alliance

Castle

1985: 2 x UUP, 1 x SDLP, 1 x DUP, 1 x Alliance, 1 x Independent Unionist

Court

1985: 2 x UUP, 1 x DUP, 1 x PUP, 1 x Protestant Unionist, 1 x Independent Unionist

Laganbank

1985: 2 x UUP, 1 x DUP, 1 x SDLP, 1 x Alliance

Lower Falls

1985: 3 x Sinn Féin, 1 x SDLP, 1 x Alliance

Oldpark

1985: 2 x Sinn Féin, 1 x UUP, 1 x SDLP, 1 x DUP, 1 x Workers' Party

Pottinger

1985: 3 x DUP, 2 x UUP, 1 x Alliance

Upper Falls

1985: 2 x Sinn Féin, 2 x SDLP, 1 x Alliance

Victoria

1985: 3 x UUP, 2 x DUP, 2 x Alliance

References

Belfast City Council elections
Belfast